Romica Puceanu (1926–1996) was a Romanian Romani people singer and interpreter of urban lăutărească music from Romania.

Early life
Puceanu started to sing professionally when she was 14, with the "Brothers Gore taraf", one of the most famous tarafuri of the time.

Career
She was highly appreciated for her unique voice and for the sensibility of her singing.

Personal life
Despite her professional success, she had an unhappy love life, which led to some drinking problems, and also affected her voice in the latter part of her life.

She was married to the accordionist Bebe Șerban (also known as "Bebe de la Petrichioaia" – "Bebe from Petrichioaia"). Cornelia Teișanu, her niece, is also a singer.

Death
Puceanu died as a result of a car accident in 1996.

See also 
 Music of Romania

References 
  Romica Puceanu collection edition, Jurnalul Național, March 26, 2007
 
 The Romanian Doina

External links 
 Video recording of Romica Puceanu's performance, from the archives of the Romanian Television

1926 births
1996 deaths
Musicians from Bucharest
Place of birth missing
Romani musicians
Romanian manele singers
Romanian Romani people
Lăutari and lăutărească music
20th-century Romanian women singers
20th-century Romanian singers
Romani singers